Wil Ohl Kʼinich was the eighth ruler of the Maya city state Copan. He was nicknamed Head on Earth by archaeologists.

Notes

References

 

6th-century monarchs in North America
Rulers of Copán
551 deaths
Year of birth missing
6th century in the Maya civilization